The 1988 Toronto Argonauts finished in first place in the East Division with a 14–4 record. They appeared in the East Final. The 1988 season was the Argos' last season at Exhibition Stadium, they would move into their new stadium, SkyDome, the following year.

Offseason

Regular season

Standings

Schedule

Postseason

Awards and honours

1988 CFL All-Stars

References

Toronto Argonauts seasons
Toronto Argonauts
1988 Canadian Football League season by team